The Grabovica massacre refers to the murders of at least 33 ethnic Croat inhabitants of the village of Grabovica near Jablanica by members of the Army of the Republic of Bosnia and Herzegovina (ARBiH) 9th Brigade and other unidentified members of ARBiH on 8 or 9 September 1993. Some sources cite a higher number of victims but these have never been officially corroborated.

Background

To conduct combat operations in Herzegovina to lift the HVO blockade of Mostar, units of the 9th Brigade, the 10th Brigade and the 2nd Independent Battalion, all subordinated to the ARBiH 1st Corps, were sent from Sarajevo to the Jablanica sector during Operation Neretva '93 of the ARBiH. This was the area where Grabovica was situated and it was at the time the area of responsibility of the 6th Corps. The International Criminal Tribunal for the former Yugoslavia (ICTY) found that those units were deployed to Herzegovina following an order issued by Sefer Halilović.

Murders

Grabovica was a village inhabited by Croats. It had been under ARBiH control since May 1993 and the relationship between the residents of Grabovica and the ARBiH soldiers who were stationed there was good and, as there was no other accommodation available for the arriving troops, they were supposed to be posted with the inhabitants of the village. The reputation of the arriving troops of the 9th and 10th Brigades was bad, because of "criminal and uncontrolled" elements within. According to ICTY, the evidence showed that members of both brigades not only demonstrated a lack of discipline, but also committed different forms of misappropriation (thefts etc.) The Trial Chamber noted in this respect the testimony of the 1st Corps Commander, Vahid Karavelić, who, while knowing of breaches of discipline and previous behaviour of members of these brigades, said that it never occurred to him that they might commit atrocities against civilians in Grabovica.

With the arrival of the unit of the 9th Brigade acts of violence began to occur. Throughout the night of 8 September, shooting was heard in the village. The ICTY established that by the early afternoon of 9 September, a number of inhabitants had been murdered by members of the ARBiH units present in Grabovica at the time. The ICTY Trial Chamber found that it has been established beyond reasonable doubt that 13 inhabitants (Pero Marić, Dragica Marić, Ivan Zadro, Matija Zadro, Mladen Zadro, Ljubica Zadro, Mladenka Zadro, Josip Brekalo, Martin Marić, Živko Drežnjak, Ljuba Drežnjak, Ivan Mandić and Ilka Miletić), taking no active part in the hostilities, were murdered by members of the 9th Brigade and unidentified members of the ARBiH on 8 or 9 September 1993. The Trial Chamber found that the Prosecution failed to prove beyond reasonable doubt that 14 persons listed in the indictment were killed by members of the ARBiH in Grabovica at the time relevant for the Grabovica case. The Trial Chamber noted that during trial, six of the alleged victims listed in the indictment were withdrawn.

Investigation
After the information about the murders had reached Sarajevo, the ARBiH started investigation about the crimes committed. The 6th Corps Security Service, the Military Police Battalion of the 6th Corps and the Military Police of the 44th Brigade, which was located in Jablanica, were involved in the investigation into the events in Grabovica. The Chief of Security of the ARBiH Main Staff Jusuf Jašarević was informed of the results of their investigations. The ICTY found that based on the evidence, it could not be concluded that Sefer Halilović had the material ability to punish the perpetrators of the crimes committed in Grabovica.

ICTY Trial
Bosnian commander Sefer Halilović was indicted by ICTY on the basis of superior criminal responsibility (Article 7(3) of the Statute of the Tribunal) and charged with one count of violation of the laws and customs of war (Article 3 – murder). Having examined all the evidence presented to it and in light of its factual findings, the ICTY found that the Prosecution did not prove beyond reasonable doubt that Halilović had effective control over the troops in Grabovica on 8 and 9 September 1993, who the Trial Chamber has found committed the crimes. Halilović was subsequently acquitted and ordered released immediately.

Verdicts
In 2008, the Supreme Court of the Federation of Bosnia and Herzegovina confirmed three local court convictions of 13 years in prison against Nihad Vlahovljak, Sead Karagić and Haris Rajkić, former ARBiH soldiers for the crimes committed in Grabovica. The Court determined that Vlahovljak ordered the killings, and the other two carried out the orders.

See also
Croat–Bosniak War

Notes

References

Books
 
 

Grabovica
Grabrovica
1993 in Bosnia and Herzegovina
Bosniak war crimes in the Bosnian War
September 1993 events in Europe
Conflicts in 1993
Army of the Republic of Bosnia and Herzegovina
Massacres of Croats